Budarka is a rural locality (a khutor) in Poperechenskoye Rural Settlement, Kotelnikovsky District, Volgograd Oblast, Russia. The population was 39 as of 2010.

Geography 
Budarka is located 36 km southeast of Kotelnikovo (the district's administrative centre) by road. Poperechny is the nearest rural locality.

References 

Rural localities in Kotelnikovsky District